Funneliformis is a genus of fungi in the family Glomeraceae. All species are arbuscular mycorrhizal (AM) fungi that form symbiotic relationships (mycorrhizaa) with plant roots. The genus was circumscribed in 2010 by Arthur Schüßler and Christopher Walker, with Funneliformis mosseae (named after the biologist Barbara Mosse and originally described in 1968 as a species of Endogone) as the type species. The generic name refers to the funnel-shaped spore base present in several species.

Species
Funneliformis africanum (Błaszk. & Kovács) C.Walker & A.Schüßler 2010
Funneliformis badium (Oehl, D.Redecker & Sieverd.) C.Walker & A.Schüßler 2010
Funneliformis caledonium (T.H.Nicolson & Gerd.) C.Walker & A.Schüßler 2010
Funneliformis constrictum (Trappe) C.Walker & A.Schüßler 2010
Funneliformis coronatum (Giovann.) C.Walker & A.Schüßler 2010
Funneliformis fragilistratum (Skou & I. Jakobsen) C.Walker & A.Schüßler 2010
Funneliformis geosporum (T.H.Nicolson & Gerd.) C.Walker & A.Schüßler 2010
Funneliformis mosseae (T.H.Nicolson & Gerd.) C.Walker & A.Schüßler 2010
Funneliformis verruculosum (Błaszk.) C.Walker & A. Schüßler 2010 
Funneliformis xanthium (Błaszk., Blanke, Renker & Buscot) C.Walker & A.Schüßler 2010

References

External links

Fungus genera
Glomerales